Archimedes' heat ray is a device that Archimedes is purported to have used to burn attacking Roman ships during the Siege of Syracuse (c. 214–212 BC). It does not appear in the surviving works of Archimedes and is described by historians writing many years after the siege.

Historical accounts of the heat ray

The 2nd century AD author Lucian wrote that during the Siege of Syracuse, Archimedes destroyed enemy ships with fire. Centuries later, Anthemius of Tralles mentions burning-glasses as Archimedes' weapon. The device was used to focus sunlight onto approaching ships, causing them to catch fire.

Modern attempts to recreate the heat ray

The heat ray has been the subject of ongoing debate about its credibility since the Renaissance. René Descartes rejected it as false, while modern researchers have attempted to recreate the effect using only the means that would have been available to Archimedes. It has been suggested that a large array of highly polished bronze or copper shields acting as mirrors could have been employed to focus sunlight onto a ship.

A test of the Archimedes heat ray was carried out in 1973 by the Greek scientist Ioannis Sakkas. The experiment took place at the Skaramagas naval base outside Athens. On this occasion 70 mirrors were used, each with a copper coating and a size of around five by three feet (1.5 by 1 m). The mirrors were pointed at a plywood  of a Roman warship at a distance of around 160 feet (50 m). When the mirrors were focused accurately, the ship burst into flames within a few seconds. The plywood ship had a coating of tar paint, which may have aided combustion.

In October 2005, a group of students from the Massachusetts Institute of Technology carried out an experiment with 127 one-foot (30 cm) square mirror tiles, focused on a  wooden ship at a range of around 100 feet (30 m). Flames broke out on a patch of the ship, but only after the sky had been cloudless and the ship had remained stationary for around ten minutes. It was concluded that the device was a feasible weapon under these conditions. The MIT group repeated the experiment for the television show MythBusters, using a wooden fishing boat in San Francisco as the target. Again some charring occurred, along with a small amount of flame. When MythBusters broadcast the result of the San Francisco experiment in January 2006, the claim was placed in the category of "busted" (or failed) because of the length of time and the ideal weather conditions required for combustion to occur. It was pointed out that since Syracuse faces the sea towards the east, the Roman fleet would have had to attack during the morning for optimal gathering of light by the mirrors. MythBusters also pointed out that conventional weaponry, such as flaming arrows or bolts from a catapult, would have been a far easier way of setting a ship on fire at short distances.

In December 2010, MythBusters again looked at the heat ray in a special edition entitled "President's Challenge". In all of the experiments, the sail failed to reach the 210 °C (410 °F) required to catch fire, and the verdict was again "busted". The show concluded that a more likely effect of the mirrors would have been blinding, dazzling, or distracting the crew of the ship.

See also

References

Ancient inventions
Ancient Greek military equipment
Second Punic War